Syntax are an English electronic music group originally formed in 2000 by the musicians Jan Burton (also the band's vocalist) and Mike Tournier (ex-member of the band Fluke). They are best known for the songs "Destiny", "Bliss" and "Pride".

History 
After the success of Fluke's album Risotto, Mike Tournier wanted to move to a much darker production style. He left Fluke and founded Syntax with Jan Burton in 2000.

In 2003, Syntax released their debut album Meccano Mind on Illustrious Records. Meccano Mind is a combination of Burton and Tournier's different influences from rock and dance music. Three singles were issued: "Pray", "Message" and "Bliss" (#69 UK). The Japanese edition included three additional tracks, entitled "Sexograph", "Woman", and "Love Song (I Wonder Why)". Despite the originality of Meccano Mind, the band suffered from poor album sales and the group split in 2004.

Their music has been featured on various TV series, films and video games like The O.C., Nip/Tuck, The Invisible and DRIV3R.

Many years after the split, Syntax reformed, citing that "people were asking for more", and began working on a series of EPs titled Tripolar. The first episode had been completed while work continued on the second and third episodes. Unlike their first album, their second has been released on their own independent label.

in 2012, Syntax released additional material from their first album Meccano Mind and have released three additional tracks: "Little Love (alternative mix)", "Peace Vibration" and "Sensation".

As of 2020, Syntax had their music removed from all streaming platforms due to a trademark dispute with a US band of the same name. This has led to widespread copyright strikes by Douglas Martens against any artist using the noun "syntax" in their name. This issue has not been solved as of yet.

Jan Burton has told rumors of trying to reform Syntax with Mike Tournier in 2022. Nothing new has come as of now.

Media usage
Syntax's music has been used and highlighted in several TV series, film and video games.

Discography

Albums
Meccano Mind (2003)
Tripolar - EP (2012)

Singles

See also
2 Bit Pie
Fluke

References

English electronic music groups
Musicians from Sheffield